Breath of the Gods – A Journey to the Origins of Modern Yoga  is a 2012 German documentary about the origins of modern yoga as exercise in the life and work of Tirumalai Krishnamacharya.

Summary
Jan Schmidt-Garre depicts the life and work of Tirumalai Krishnamacharya by interviewing people who knew him. He is told how and why this pioneer started to run a public Hatha yoga school and shares the information with the audience. Contemporary shots are intercut with historical footage. Thus he explores questions which are crucial for Western adepts, such as whether Hatha Yoga really is of ancient origin and whether it is free from religion or interwoven with hinduistic beliefs. Finally he reveals that Krishnamacharya regularly attended a temple where was inspired by ancient pictures of an ancient demonstrating asanas.

Selected list of appearing persons
 T. Krishnamacharya
 K. Pattabhi Jois
 B. K. S. Iyengar
 T. K. Sribhashyam
 Alamelu Sheshadri

Reception
Rotten Tomatoes, a review aggregator, reports that 44% of nine surveyed critics gave the film a positive review; the average rating was 5.2/10.  Siobhan Synnot of The Scotsman wrote, "True believers may be riveted by this earnest salute to the sun, but for others this enthusiastic showcase of impressively bendy people stretches the patience at 105 minutes."  Mike McCahill of The Guardian rated it 2/5 stars and called it "wearyingly attenuated".  Patrick Peters of Empire rated it 3/5 stars and called it a "lyrical, thoughtful, moving pilgrimage".  Kevin Harley of Total Film rated it 3/5 stars and wrote that "it lacks narrative momentum but not warm humour or extreme headstands".  Umut Gunduz of Little White Lies wrote that the film is ruined by the host's lack of knowledge about the topic.  Allan Hunter of the Daily Express called it "a surprisingly engaging documentary".

References

External links
 
 
 
 

2012 films
2012 documentary films
German documentary films
German independent films
Documentary films about India
Documentary films about Hinduism
Yoga mass media
2012 independent films
2010s German films